is a multipurpose concrete Arch-gravity dam in located in Ōdai,  Mie Prefecture, Japan. completed in 1966.
The dam is one of several crossing the Miyagawa River, and was intended for  hydroelectric power generation, and for the supply of industrial water to the Ise Bay industrial region.

The Misedani Dame was constructed by Nishimatsu Construction Co., Ltd., with construction starting in 1963, and completed by 1965. It is currently owned maintained by the Mie prefectural government.

References 

Dams in Mie Prefecture
Dams completed in 1966
Gravity dams
Hydroelectric power stations in Japan